UDI '19 is a football club from Uden, Netherlands. UDI '19 plays in the 2017–18 Sunday Hoofdklasse B. after relegating from Sunday Derde Divisie in the previous season.

References

External links
 Official site

Football clubs in the Netherlands
Football clubs in North Brabant
Association football clubs established in 1919
1919 establishments in the Netherlands
Sport in Uden